Althepus tibiatus is a species of spider of the genus Althepus.

Distribution
The species is endemic to Chiang Mai Province in Thailand. It is found at Tham Chiang Dao and Tham Pha Deng caves.

References

Psilodercidae
Endemic fauna of Thailand
Spiders of Asia
Spiders described in 1985